Blind Intersections is a 2012 Lebanese drama film directed by Lara Saba. The film was selected as the Lebanese entry for the Best Foreign Language Film at the 86th Academy Awards, but it was not nominated.

Cast
 Ghida Nouri as Nour  
 Alae Hamoud as Marwan  
 Charbel Ziade as Malek

See also
 List of submissions to the 86th Academy Awards for Best Foreign Language Film
 List of Lebanese submissions for the Academy Award for Best Foreign Language Film

References

External links
 

2012 films
2012 drama films
2010s Arabic-language films
Lebanese drama films